
Year 544 (DXLIV) was a leap year starting on Friday (link will display the full calendar) of the Julian calendar. The denomination 544 for this year has been used since the early medieval period, when the Anno Domini calendar era became the prevalent method in Europe for naming years.

Events 
 By place 

 Byzantine Empire 
 Gothic War: Emperor Justinian I sends Belisarius back to the Ostrogothic Kingdom (Italy) with an inadequate Byzantine expeditionary force (4,000 men and 200 ships). 
 Belisarius defeats the Gothic army under King Totila, who unsuccessfully besieges the city of Otranto (southern Italy). After their retreat, the Byzantines march towards Rome.  
 Justinian I issues a new edict condemning the Three Chapters. In Western Europe, Pope Vigilius refuses to acknowledge the imperial edict and is ordered to Constantinople.

 Persia 

 King Khosrau I unsuccessfully attacks the Byzantine fortress city of Dara. The siege of Edessa is repulsed, and the Persians are forced into a stalemate.

 Africa 

 Battle of Cillium: A medium-sized Byzantine army under Solomon is defeated by the Moors on the border of Numidia. Solomon and his bodyguard are forced to retreat and are later killed.

 Asia 
 February – Lý Bí is declared emperor and establishes the empire Van Xuân (modern Vietnam). His armies repel attacks from the kingdom of Champa.
 October – The Liang dynasty retaliates against Van Xuân, and sends an imperial army (120,000 men) under Chen Baxian to re-occupy the region.

 By topic 

 Religion 
 Jacob Baradaeus consecrates Sergius of Tella as patriarch of Antioch, opening a permanent schism between the Syriac Orthodox Church and the Eastern Orthodox Church.

Births 
 Dugu Qieluo, empress of the Sui dynasty (d. 602)
 Jing Di, emperor of the Liang dynasty (d. 558)
 Yuwen Xian, prince of Northern Zhou (d. 578)

Deaths 
 October 18 – Wenna, Cornish saint (approximate date)
 Dionysius Exiguus, inventor of the Anno Domini era (approximate date)
 Solomon, Byzantine general and prefect of Africa

References

Bibliography